Sesh Sangbad (English : Last News) is a 2016 Bengali language crime-thriller film written & directed by Pallav Gupta. The film star Srabanti in lead role.

Plot
This is the journey of Sarmista, an upright and honest investigative journalist through the web of media politics and her fight for the truth. She braves various situations to capture news at great personal risk only to realize, to her horror and disbelief, that the channel won't telecast her report.

Cast 
Srabanti Chatterjee as Sharmistha
Sujoy Ghosh
Moushumi Chatterjee as Elina 
Partha Sarathi as Alok

Music

The album is composed by Amit Sur.

References

External links
 

Bengali-language Indian films
2010s Bengali-language films